Controlling law is a legal term used in  contracts, trusts, or other legal documents. It refers to the laws of the state which will be relied upon in settling disputes, and is often stated as one of the provisions in an official agreement between two parties. The term is used most frequently in contracts formed between two parties that do not reside in the same state. In such an instance, the authoring party usually includes a clause asserting that any litigation that arises involving the contract must do so under the laws of the author's home state.

Establishing which state will be the venue for litigation is an important part of any contract, and affects nearly every form of industry or commerce that transcends borders. For example, in the United States, many insurance companies choose to locate their headquarters in Iowa or Connecticut where state law is seen as favorable to their interests. This ensures that any legal action taken against the corporation will occur under friendly laws. The same phenomenon occurs in the software industry as well, with the majority of End User License Agreements including an item that establishes the laws of their home state as controlling law.

Controlling law can also have an effect on whether or not a lawsuit begins in the first place. When the plaintiff resides in a different state than the defendant, taking action can be extremely expensive. The costs of hiring an attorney in the area, along with the costs of travel and wages lost from appearing in court, can often discourage them from filing the lawsuit. This effectively limits the number of minor claims brought against the author of the contract, although more serious claims are often brought without regard to the expense.

See also
Forum selection clause
Choice of law clause

American legal terminology
Civil procedure legal terminology
Contract law legal terminology